Isabel is a 1968 Canadian film written, directed and produced by Paul Almond.

Synopsis
Learning of her mother's serious illness, Isabel (Geneviève Bujold) returns to her family's farm on the Gaspé Peninsula. Her mother dies before she can get there, and when her aged uncle Matthew (Gerard Parkes) asks her to stay on and help him with the farm, she reluctantly agrees. She finds herself haunted by memories of early years (domestic violence, incest and the mysterious deaths of her grandfather, who died in a freak accident, and her father and brother, who both drowned at sea) in a house full of eerie sights and sounds.

Cast

Reception
Isabel is the first film of Paul Almond's trilogy made with his then-wife Geneviève Bujold, it won four Canadian Film Awards, and was one of the early Canadian films to be distributed by a major Hollywood studio (Paramount Pictures).

It was featured in the Canadian Cinema television series which aired on CBC Television in 1974.

References

External links

1968 films
Films set in Quebec
Gaspé Peninsula
1968 drama films
Canadian drama films
English-language Canadian films
Films directed by Paul Almond
1960s English-language films
1960s Canadian films